The 2006 Calgary Stampeders season was the 49th season for the team in the Canadian Football League and their 68th overall. The Stampeders finished 2nd place in the West division with a 10–8 record. They appeared in the West Semi-Final where they lost to the Saskatchewan Roughriders.

Offseason

CFL Draft

Preseason

Regular season

Season standings

Season schedule

Playoffs

Schedule

West Semi-Final

Awards and records

2006 CFL All-Stars
 LB – Brian Clark
 K – Sandro DeAngelis
 OG – Jay McNeil
 RB – Joffrey Reynolds
 CB – Coby Rhinehart

References

Calgary Stampeders
Calgary Stampeders seasons
2006 in Alberta